An agathodaemon or agathodaimon was a spirit of vineyards and grainfields in the religion of the ancient Greeks.

Agathodaemon or Agathodaimon may also refer to
Set (deity), the Egyptian god
The Canopic Branch of the Nile Delta, called the Agathodaemon or Agathodaimon in Ptolemy's Geography
Agathodaemon (alchemist), the 3rd-century Egyptian alchemist
Agathodaemon of Alexandria, an Egyptian cartographer of uncertain date connected with Ptolemy's Geography
Agathodaemon, a Martian canal named for the cartographer
Agathodaemon (grammarian), the 5th-century Egyptian grammarian
Agathodaimon (band), a German band playing death metal
 Agathos Daimon (boxer), who died in ancient Olympia aged 35 having promised Zeus victory or death.